Scaloporhinus is a genus of extinct therocephalian from the Permian of South Africa. It contains the single species S. angulorugatus. The species possesses a parietal foramen, a feature that is lost in many species of this group.

References 

Permian Africa
Therocephalia genera